Lalbagh Palace is a residential royal palace situated in Indore, Madhya Pradesh, India. It was built under the holkar dynasty, which ruled the indore state.

History
Spread over 76 acres of property, the construction of the 45-room palace happened in three phases. Starting with Tukojirao Holkar II in 1886, who acquired this property and was completed under his grandson, Tukojirao Holkar III in 1926. It is built in the Italian Renaissance Revival architecture styleand once had a 20-acre rose garden, while its main gates are modelled after those at the Buckingham Palace, by Triggs of Calcutta. 

After the death of Tukojirao Holkar III in 1978, his third wife, an American, Sharmishtha Devi (formerly Nancy Anne Miller) moved out and subsequently, the palace was converted into a museum. Much of the first floor was destroyed in a fire. In the 1980s, the palace fell into disrepair and was prone to theft of its antiques before the state government acquired the property in 1987 for Rs 64.46 lakh.

Current status
It is inscribed by the Archaeological Survey of India (ASI) as a protected monument. 

It will be renovated by the World Monuments Fund under the aegis of the Madhya Pradesh state Government. 

Amongst others, parts of Hindi film Kalank (2019) with  Varun Dhawan, Alia Bhatt, and Madhuri Dixit, were shot here.

See also 
 Rajwada, main palace 
 Manik Bagh

References

External links 

1926 establishments in India
Buildings and structures in Indore
History of Indore
Monuments and memorials in Madhya Pradesh
Palaces in Madhya Pradesh
Royal residences in India
Tourist attractions in Indore
Renaissance Revival architecture